Oladejo may refer to:

Nathaniel Oladejo Ogundipe (born ?), Nigerian Anglican bishop
Oladejo Victor Akinlonu (born 1963), Nigerian artist, sculptor, philosopher, and art marketer
Oyin Oladejo (born 1985), Nigerian-born Canadian actress